Corey Aden Tutt  is an Aboriginal Australian mentor and STEM champion. He is the founder of DeadlyScience, an initiative that provides STEM Resources to remote schools in Australia. Tutt is the 2020 NSW Young Australian of the Year.

Early life and family 
Corey Aden Tutt grew up in the Illawarra, New South Wales, and is of Kamilaroi heritage. Tutt attended Dapto High School, where his favourite subjects were science, agriculture and history and animals.

In 2020 Tutt appeared on ABC Radio National program, Sunday Extra, with Julian Morrow, in the segment entitled "The Year That Made Me", and spoke about the year he lost a close friend to suicide, 2011, and the impacts that had on him which led him to becoming an alpaca shearer, and finding the love of science again.

In 2022 Tutt married his long-term partner.

Tutt is currently Rugby Union player for the Port Macquarie Pirates

Career 
He began his career as a zookeeper on the NSW South Coast, then spent time as an alpaca shearer travelling throughout Australia and New Zealand.

He then started working as a research assistant at the University of Sydney's Matilda Centre for Research in Mental Health and Substance Use.

Tutt currently is a board member of the Digital rights group and the climate change group seed mob.

He also is an author and TV presenter. In Addition to this work Tutt has two regular science shows one on ABC mid north coast called Getting wild with Corey Tutt. “Where he discusses science facts of different animal species”.

He has another show on ABC Pilbara called “Deadly yarns” which talks about spices in the Pilbara.

DeadlyScience 
He founded DeadlyScience while working at the university. Starting off by sending his own books and other resources, including telescopes to remote schools, Tutt started coordinating donated resources, including books from high-profile scientists such as Brian Cox and Karl Kruszelnicki. By 2020 he had delivered 7,000 books and 200 telescopes to over 100 schools and foundations. He wants to encourage Indigenous students in remote communities to pursue a career in STEM.

He particularly wants to ensure that every remote Australian school has resources that tell the true history of Australia's first scientists, such as Bruce Pascoe's book, Dark Emu.

From 2019, Tutt founded a series of Deadly Junior Scientist Awards, aimed at inspiring Indigenous students to engage with STEM and to examine local wildlife and land in a scientific way.

In 2020, DeadlyScience began assisting with rebuilding schools affected by devastating bush fires which ravaged most of the South Coast of New South Wales. They did this by providing books and resources to schools that have been destroyed by fire. DeadlyScience also successfully raised  for Broome Primary School in Western Australia that was burnt down by an arson attack. Tutt said on the ABC Nightlife program "Schools are the heartbeat of our community and for our community in Broome we stand with you during this dark time".

In 2020 he was made NSW Young Australian of the Year.

In 2021 Tutt led a huge project to provide food and educational supplies to Aboriginal families in NSW struggling with COVID-19. During the floods on the Mid-north coast of NSW in 2021, when Telegraph Point Public School was destroyed by flooding, Tutt donated books to replace the books lost by the school.

During the 2021 COVID-19 outbreak in NSW, Tutt led a social media campaign to support kids and families doing it tough in lockdown, and sent books to families.

Tutt appeared on Wil Anderson's podcast Wilosphy, in which he spoke about overcoming trauma as a child to create DeadlyScience.

By October 2021, DeadlyScience had distributed more than 25,000 books and other STEM resources to over 110 communities around the country.

In 2022 DeadlyScience featured on both Mclaren formula one racing teams cars for the Melbourne GP. Software company smart sheet donated their sponsorship to DeadlyScience.

In 2022 DeadlyScience donated Lego to over 200 schools across Australia.

In 2022 Tutt organised a bus for Cabbage Tree Island Community school after the devastating floods that destroyed their school.

Tutt also gave every child, from three schools devastated by the floods, a brand new book so they would not lose their passions for STEM.

Other roles
Tutt is also a member of the equity and diversity committee at Science & Technology Australia.

Recognition and awards 
 2019: AMP Foundation Tomorrow Maker
 2019: STEM Champion Award, in the 2019 Indigenous STEM Awards 
 2020: ABC Trailblazer Heywire 
 2020: Indigenous STEM Champion CSIRO
 2020: NSW Young Australian of the Year 
 2020: One of ten Human Rights Heroes at the substitute Human Rights Awards
 2021: The Australian Museum's Eureka Prize for STEM Inclusion, with Team DeadlyScience:
 2022: Finalist for NSW/ACT Indigenous Young Achiever awards
 2022: Medal of the Order of Australia (OAM)

References

External links

Living people
Australian indigenous rights activists
Recipients of the Medal of the Order of Australia
Australian of the Year Award winners
Science advocacy organizations
Gamilaraay
Year of birth missing (living people)